

Mayors of Pasadena, California

References

Pasadena
.
M